Nicole Levesque (Andres) (born April 11, 1972) is a former American basketball player who played point guard at Wake Forest and for the Charlotte Sting in the WNBA. In 1999, she was named to Sports Illustrated's 50 Greatest Sports Figures from Vermont, and is the only Vermonter to ever play in the WNBA.

High school
After a standout playing career at Mount Anthony Union High School in Bennington, Vermont where she helped the Patriots capture two Division I state titles in 1988 and 1990 while scoring a total of 1,938 points in her career, good for fifth all-time in the state. She was also a standout soccer player who scored 148 goals for Mount Anthony, which was a state record until 2015.

College career
In 1990 Levesque headed to Wake Forest, where she set a number of school records. She was named to the ACC's All-Freshman team in her first season with the Deamon Deacons, and was a two-time ACC Second Team All-Conference Selection. She was also the winner of the Frances Pomeroy Naismith Award in 1994, given to the top senior in the nation under 5 ft 8in. In 1991, Levesque was also part of USA Basketball's Olympic Festival East team and was a Fast Break All-American.

Levesque ended her college career with 1,663 points, while becoming the school's leader in minutes played, free throws made, free throw percentage, while also being second in assists and three-pointers made.

Professional career
During the WNBA's inaugural 1997 season, Levesque signed with the Charlotte Sting where she appeared in 27 games, averaging 4.0 points per game and 2.8 assists per game. She also played professionally in Europe.

Coaching career
Returning to her native Vermont, Levesque was an assistant coach for two seasons at Vermont under Keith Cieplicki, and was part of the staff that won the America East Conference title and participated in the 2000 NCAA tournament.

Personal
Levesque is a member of the Vermont Sports Hall of Fame, Vermont Principal's Association Hall of Fame and New England Basketball Hall of Fame. She and her husband, Dr. Mark Andres reside in Pensacola, Florida.

References

1972 births
Living people
American women's basketball coaches
American women's basketball players
Basketball players from Vermont
Charlotte Sting players
People from Shaftsbury, Vermont
Vermont Catamounts women's basketball coaches
Wake Forest Demon Deacons women's basketball players
Point guards